Jack Perkins may refer to:
Jack Perkins (footballer) (1903–1955), Australian rules footballer
Jack Perkins (actor) (1921–1998), American film actor
Jack Perkins (reporter) (1933–2019), American reporter and anchorman
Jack Perkins (racing driver) (born 1986), Australian V8 Supercar driver

See also
John Perkins (disambiguation)